Sengli Co or Senlicuo or Sengli Tso is a freshwater alpine lake of Zhongba County, Shigatse in Southern Tibet, China.

Location 
Its water runs north to south through Laiwuzangbo before entering Dangquezangbo (Maquan River) in the Yarlung Zangbo River's upper sections.

References

Shigatse
Lakes of Tibet